For main Top 5 Division, see: 2011 Asian Five Nations

The 2011 Asian Five Nations division tournaments, known as the 2011 HSBC Asian 5 Nations due to the tournament's sponsorship by the HSBC, refer to the divisions played within the tournament. This was the 4th series of the Asian Five Nations. 

There were five divisional teams in the 2011 version who contested for a place in the Top 5 tournament. Who ever finished last place in a division was relegated, while the winner of a division was promoted. Last place in division 1 was replaced by the winner of division 2, winner of division 3 replaced last place in division 2, winner in division 4 replaced last in division 3 and winner in division 5 replaced last in division 4.

Changes from 2010
 South Korea becomes one of the first Asian Top 5 giants to be relegated to Division 1.
 Sri Lanka are no longer competing in Division 1, following promotion to the Top 5 Division.
 Philippines have replaced Chinese Taipei in Division 1, with Chinese Taipei competing in Division 2.
 Iran will compete in Division 2 - replacing China, following promotion from Division 3.
 Cambodia and Laos form a newly introduced Division 5.

Teams
The teams involved, with their world rankings pre tournament, were:

Division 1
  (58)
  (NA)
  (51)
  (34)

Division 2
  (61)
  (75)
  (NA)
  (60)

Division 3
  (66)
  (82)
  (NA)
  (NA)

Division 4
  (NA)
  (NA)
  (NA)
  (NA)

Division 5
  (NA)
  (NA)

Division 1

Semi-finals

Third place play-off 

Malaysia are relegated to Division II for 2012.

Finals 

South Korea are promoted to the 2012 Asian Five Nations.

Division 2

Semi-finals

Third place play-off 

India are relegated to Division III for 2012.

Finals 

Chinese Taipei are promoted to Division I for 2012.

Division 3

Semi-finals

Third place play-off 

Pakistan are relegated to Division IV for 2012.

Final 

China are promoted to Division II in 2012.

Division 4

Semi-finals

Third place play-off 

Uzbekistan are relegated to Division V for 2012.

Final 

Qatar are promoted to Division III for 2012.

Division 5

 

Laos are promoted to Division IV for 2012.

References

External links
Official Website
ARFU

2011
2011 in Asian rugby union
Asia